Genlujeh (also Romanized as Genlūjeh; also known as Gand Lūjeh and Ganeh Lūjeh) is a village in Arshaq-e Gharbi Rural District, Moradlu District, Meshgin Shahr County, Ardabil Province, Iran. At the 2006 census, its population was 257, in 56 families.

References 

Towns and villages in Meshgin Shahr County